Prodrive is a British motorsport and advanced engineering group based in Banbury, Oxfordshire, England. It designs, constructs and races cars for companies and teams such as Aston Martin, Bahrain Raid Xtreme and Team X44. Its advanced technology division applies this motorsport engineering approach to deliver engineering solutions into automotive OEMs, aerospace, defence, marine and other sectors, which now represents more than half its turnover. Prodrive also has a specialist composite division based in Milton Keynes where it manufactures lightweight carbon composite CFRP and visual carbon components for many supercars and increasingly for the luxury automotive, aerospace and marine sectors.

Prodrive first became well known for its involvement in the World Rally Championship with the Subaru World Rally Team, developing championship-winning cars for Colin McRae, Richard Burns and Petter Solberg, which now reside in the Prodrive heritage collection alongside many other of its classic race and rally cars at its new Banbury headquarters.  While the Subaru World Rally programme ended in 2008, today its motorsport manufacturer programmes include Aston Martin Racing in the FIA World Endurance Championship, Bahrain Raid Xtreme in the Dakar and World Rally-Raid Championship and Team X44 of Lewis Hamilton in Extreme E.

The company employs nearly 500 in the UK at operations in Banbury and Milton Keynes.

History
Prodrive was founded in 1983 by Ian Parry and David Richards, the latter is now the chairman of the group.  Originally the company was known as David Richards Autosport before becoming Prodrive in the late 1980s. Their first involvement in motorsport was with the Rothmans Porsche Rally Team, running a Porsche 911 SC RS for Henri Toivonen at the European Rally Championship and for Saeed Al Hajri in the Middle East Rally Championship. In 1986, Prodrive ran a MG Metro 6R4 in British and Irish rally championships.

In 1987, they expanded into touring cars, running BMW M3 in the British Touring Car Championship. They were the outright 1988 champions, and class B champions in 1989 and 1990. There were plans for a works entry with Mercedes during 1993 and into 1994, with Bernd Schneider slated to drive, but plans were shelved. Since then, Prodrive has run touring car programmes for Alfa Romeo (1995) for Honda (1997-8), for Ford (1999-2000 BTCC champions in 2000) and with Volvo in 2002 in the FIA European Touring Car Championship (ETCC).

In 1990, Prodrive started rallying with Subaru, a relationship which lasted until December 2008, when the global economic downturn forced their withdrawal from World Rallying.  During the near 20-year partnership, the team won three drivers' WRC titles for Colin McRae (1995), Richard Burns (2001) and Petter Solberg (2003), as well as three manufacturers' titles in 1995, 1996, and 1997.

In the winter of 1998, the company were approached by Russian oil company Lukoil to enable them to enter motorsports sponsorship. As entries to Formula 3000 were restricted, Richards agreed a deal with family friend Christian Horner that Prodrive would take a 50% stake in Horner's Arden International, in return for Horner retiring from driving and becoming team manager. As a result, Arden signed Viktor Maslov as a driver under the Lukoil deal from 1999.

In 1999, investment group Apax Partners bought 49% of Prodrive. Horner hence exercised the option to buy back the Prodrive stake in Arden. In 2007 Apax sold their investment in the business and in 2008, The Investment Dar company, based in Kuwait, acquired a share of the business.

In 2000 Prodrive expanded out of its base in Banbury, England, and bought a private proving ground in Warwickshire to house its automotive technology business.  In 2001 the company acquired Tickford and merged this automotive engineering business into its own operations.  With Tickford came subsidiary businesses in North America and Australia. The businesses in North America were subsequently sold, while in Australia, the Tickford brand was replaced by the new Ford Performance Vehicles (FPV) brand. Prodrive sold its 51% stake in Ford Performance Vehicles to Ford Australia in 2012. Prodrive also founded Ford Performance Racing in 2003, entering the V8 Supercar series in Australia after purchasing Glenn Seton Racing. This was sold in January 2013.

In 2001, Prodrive entered sports car racing with its own privately developed Ferrari 550-GTS Maranello.  Prodrive raced the car until 2004 winning numerous races in the FIA GT and American Le Mans Series.  The highlight for the programme was GTS class victory at the 24 Hours of Le Mans in 2003.

The success of this project led to a full works programme with Aston Martin and the creation of Aston Martin Racing in late 2004, a partnership between Prodrive and the British motor manufacturer.  The team won on its debut at the 12 Hours of Sebring in 2005 with its new DBR9 GT1 car. Aston Martin Racing subsequently competed in the American Le Mans Series and at Le Mans with the highlights of the programme being two GT1 class victories at Le Mans in 2007 and 2008.  In 2009 the team developed a new LMP1 car and won the 2009 Le Mans Series and was fourth at Le Mans and the fastest petrol powered car.  This programme continues today with the team competing in the FIA World Endurance Championship (WEC) with the Vantage GTE. In 2016 it won the FIA WEC Pro teams' and drivers' titles; in 2017 its fourth Le Mans title and the same year the FIA WEC GTE Am teams' and drivers' titles. In 2020 the team won the GTE title at Le Mans and went on to claim the GT manufacturers' title in the WEC.  Today Prodrive runs the NorthWest AMR team in the GTE Am class of the FIA WEC.

In December 2001 Prodrive was brought in to manage the unsuccessful Formula One constructor BAR. Richards was appointed as team principal of BAR. Under Prodrive management the team's fortunes were turned around and by the end of the 2004 season, the BAR Honda F1 team was second in the F1 constructors' championship.  At that point the owners, BAT (British American Tobacco), sold the team to Honda.  The Prodrive management contract was ended and Prodrive's managing director Nick Fry assumed the role of team principal.  Prodrive has subsequently been linked with Formula One on a number of occasions since (see below for details).

In March 2007 a consortium led by Prodrive chairman David Richards bought British sports car firm Aston Martin from Ford, bringing Aston Martin back into British control.  Prodrive had no financial involvement in the deal.  
Richards was chairman of Aston Martin from 2007 until the end of 2013 when he stepped down.
Richards himself is a long-time Aston Martin enthusiast, and owns an extensive collection of both modern and historic models.

Following Subaru's withdrawal from the World Rally Championship in 2008, Prodrive began developing a generic rally car for the new 2011 regulations.  A works deal was agree with BMW to take Mini back into rallying and the Mini WRC Team competed in the 2011 World Rally Championship. In 2013 Prodrive created the first Mini rallycross based on the Mini JCW World Rally Car. It competed in the Global Rallycross Championship winning on its debut with Liam Doran. In 2018 the team returned to rallycross developing the Renault Mégane RS RX the most advanced rallycross car ever created, which competed in the FIA World Rallycross Championship in 2018 and 2019.

Using knowledge gained from developing the Mini, Prodrive developed a near WRC specification VW Golf to compete for the FAW-VW rally team in the Chinese Rally Championship. The car won on its debut and took both the manufacturers’ and drivers’ titles in 2015 as well as further titles in the following years

In April 2015 Prodrive relocated its headquarters by the M40 motorway in Banbury to a new facility one mile south but still adjacent to the M40. This houses the Motorsport and Advanced Technology businesses.

In 2016 Prodrive developed a one-off car for Subaru to set a new record lap of the Isle of Man TT circuit. The car driven by Manxman, Mark Higgins, competing the 37.7 mile circuit at an average speed of 128.671 mph smashing his previous record.  The car was then used in 2017 to set a new lap record of the Nürburgring for a four-door saloon.Driven by Richie Stanaway, it recorded a time of 6:57.5. In 2018 it took on the 50 mile Transfăgărășan Highway.

During the last decade Prodrive's non-motorsport activities have grown to represent the majority of the company's turnover. Its client base is very diverse and as well as many major car manufacturers includes aerospace, marine and defence businesses. It worked with the Land Rover BAR America's Cup team to develop control systems and new technology for the team's ‘flying’ catamaran. In 2016 the company also announced its plans to engineer the world's lightest folding bike to market, The Hummingbird.

Motorsport Activities

World Rally Championship

In 1990, Prodrive began a long-standing and highly successful relationship with Subaru, forming the Subaru World Rally Team. Prodrive was tasked with running Subaru's rallying campaigns, helping them to three Drivers' and three Manufacturers' World Rally Championships (WRC). Starting out with the Subaru Legacy, they achieved minor success in the WRC with regular drivers Colin McRae and Ari Vatanen. The first Subaru victory in the WRC was by McRae in a Legacy during the 1993 Rally New Zealand. The smaller and more agile Impreza became the platform which Prodrive would be most successful within rally. Scotland's Colin McRae won the 1995 World Rally Championship for drivers, followed later by England's Richard Burns in 2001 and Norwegian Petter Solberg in 2003. All three championship Subarus were prepared and run by Prodrive.

The distinctive blue with yellow colour scheme was a throwback to the early 1990s sponsorship deal with 555, a BAT cigarette brand popular in Asia.

After a number of years of poor performances, Subaru announced their withdrawal from the WRC at the end of the 2008 season.

On 27 July 2010, it was announced that Prodrive would re-enter the WRC with a limited programme in 2011 with BMW using the Mini Countryman. The Mini WRC Team made its debut at the Italian Rally in Sardinia in 2011. While there is no longer a works team, Prodrive continues to build and run Minis for customers in the World Rally Championship and national rally series.

In 2014, Prodrive developed a new rally car based on the Volkswagen Golf specifically for the Chinese Rally Championship.  The car now competes for the FAW VW Rally Team in this series with Prodrive support.

Rallycross
In 2013 Prodrive developed the Mini RX a new rallycross car based on the Mini WRC.  It was built to FIA regulations and won on its debut in the Global Rallycross Championship (GRC) in Munich driven by Liam Doran.  The car also competed in the GRC in North America.

In April 2018, GC Kompetition (GCK) unveiled the Renault Mégane RS RX, the most technologically advanced rallycross car ever created. GCK appointed Prodrive to design the Mégane RS RX who subsequently operated the team in the 2018 & 2019 FIA World Rallycross Championship.

Dakar/Rally Raid
In 2020 Prodrive in partnership with the Kingdom of Bahrain's sovereign wealth fund, Mumtalakat created a new team called Bahrain Raid Xtreme.  The team competed in the Dakar Rally in Saudi Arabia in 2021 with nine time World Rally Champion, Sebastien Loeb and two time Dakar winner, Nani Roma.  Nani Roma finished fifth in the Prodrive Hunter T1 car, the highest placing for any team on its debut in the history of the event.  Sebastien Loeb retired from the event. The team return to the Dakar in 2022 and this time Loeb finished 2nd and Argentinian driver, Orlando Terranova 4th. The team won three stages and set a record by becoming the first to win a stage of the event running on a sustainable fuel, made from agricultural waste.  The team now competes in the new 2022 FIA World Rally-Raid Championship.

Extreme E
In 2021 Sir Lewis Hamilton asked Prodrive to run his new X44 team in the new Extreme E electric off-road championship. The team's drivers, Sebastien Loeb and Cristina Gutierrez finished second in the championship in their electric Odyssey 21.  The team is now competing in the 2022 championship.

GT Racing
In 2017 Bob Nevelle asked Prodrive to run the Nissan GT Academy Program in the 2017 British GT Championship with a 2017-spec Nissan GT-R Nismo GT3 with Harry Tincknell, Gätean Paletou, Alex Buncombe and Aaditya Gayadeen been the registered drivers for the team.

The team participated in four rounds with Paletou and Tincknell driving in the Pro-Am Cup while there Silver Cup Car entrant of Gayadeen and Buncombe participated in five rounds of the series. The team who was announced ineligible to score points in the series because of not participating in the first round.

Formula One

Starting in the 2002 season, Prodrive was awarded a five-year management contract to run British American Racing (BAR), with David Richards becoming team principal. BAR owners British American Tobacco and Prodrive had a prior relationship with BAT sponsoring Subaru's World Rally Championship team, operated by Prodrive. The team experienced modest results throughout their first two seasons before finishing second in the Constructors' Championship in 2004, with drivers Jenson Button and Takuma Sato. However, Prodrive's contract was terminated early, following their best season after Honda's purchase of BAR.

On 28 April 2006, Prodrive were officially granted entry to F1 when the FIA announced the list of entrants to the 2008 Formula One World Championship.  FIA president Max Mosley was impressed by Prodrive's bid, which beat off stiff competition from the likes of Carlin Motorsport, the Jean Alesi-led McLaren-supported Direxiv outfit, BAR co-founder Craig Pollock, former Minardi owner Paul Stoddart and ex-Jordan Grand Prix team principal, Eddie Jordan.  He revealed that Prodrive have found the finances to support their bid, adding: "Prodrive has the best combination of financial backing, technical capability and motorsport experience. Also, Prodrive's chief executive, David Richards, has experience as a Formula One team principal".

Following a legal challenge by Williams to Prodrive's proposed use of a customer car David Richards announced on 23 November 2007 that Prodrive would not be entering Formula One for the 2008 season. Richards made it clear that it was still the intention of Prodrive to enter Formula One.  However, following further clarifications of the rules surrounding the use of customer cars, and the resulting ban on the use of customer chassis from the beginning of the 2009 F1 season, the pursuit of an entry via the customer car route has been abandoned.  Richards has previously stated that entry as an independent constructor would be prohibitively expensive.

Prodrive boss David Richards was linked to buying out the abandoned Honda team and using it as an output for Prodrive. The attempt was a failure, as Ross Brawn, Nick Fry and the rest of the team's management bought out the team, becoming Brawn GP.

On 23 April 2009, Prodrive issued a press release stating that they were considering an F1 entry for the 2010 season, possibly under the Aston Martin Racing brand.  On 29 May 2009, it was reported that Prodrive had submitted a formal application for the 2010 season. However, Prodrive was not accepted to the final grid. Prodrive was one of two potential buyers considered by the Renault F1 Team to take-over the team prior to the 2010 season.  In April 2010 Prodrive announced it would not apply for the 2011 Formula One season. The slot became available after US F1 Team collapsed.

Cars

Racing Cars

Road Cars

Advanced Technology
Prodrive's Advanced Technology business represents more than half the Prodrive Group turnover and works with businesses in the automotive, aerospace, marine and defence sectors.  It develops new technologies and systems for clients which include Aston Martin, McLaren Automotive, Bentley, Rolls-Royce (commercial jet engines), Volvo and the Land Rover BAR America's Cup team.  The company has a carbon composites manufacturing facility in Milton Keynes making lightweight components for premium vehicle manufacturers, including Jaguar, Aston Martin and Bentley, and the aerospace industry.

Current and recent projects include:

Creation of a multiport DC-DC converter using silicon carbide for electric and hybrid applications
Design and manufacture of the active aero system for the McLaren P1 
Compact high-powered inverter for a new generation of electric fuel pumps for commercial jet engines
Production of the lightweight carbon bodywork and carbon interior for the McLaren P1
Design and production of the rear centre console module for the Range Rover Autobiography Black
Development of the first hybrid Ford Transit

Production of the prototype Volta electric truck 

Prodrive was a technical supplier to the Land Rover BAR team to help develop its America's Cup challenger.  Among other areas, it has developed the control systems for the foils which make the boat fly and is manufacturing all the electrical harness for the boat.

Hummingbird Bike

In 2016 Prodrive announced it was bringing the world's lightest folding bike to market called the Hummingbird, which was a concept created by Petre Cracuin.  The bike weighing 6.9 kg has a carbon frame, manufactured by Prodrive Composites, and is assembled at its headquarters in Banbury.  The bike was launched in 2017 and in 2018 an electric version was introduced. In 2022 it introduced a frame made from flax fibres.

The Fulcrum
Prodrive already had a facility at the former RAF Honiley airfield and LucasVarity proving ground near Wroxall, Warwickshire, together with Marcos and TRW.

In March 2006, Prodrive announced its intent to build a £200million,  motorsport facility called The Fulcrum. Prodrive's statement in the planning application for the facility – which could house as many as 1,000 staff – boasted of "a motorsport complex which could eventually house Prodrive's new British Prodrive F1 team", further cementing Managing Director Richards' intention to return to F1 in 2008. Until the Honiley factory is operational, Prodrive will remain at their existing Banbury headquarters.

As of 3 August 2006, Prodrive has won the support of the Warwick District Council planning committee for development of The Fulcrum. The permission covers a highly advanced engineering research and development campus, a conference facility called the Catalyst Centre and new access road, a roundabout, infrastructure, parking and landscaping. The plans still have to be presented and agreed by the British government's Department for Communities and Local Government, and there is local opposition via the Fulcrum Prodrive Action Group (FPAG) to protect the rural nature of the community and the safety of the people that live within it.

In 2014 the site was sold to Jaguar Land Rover.

Prodrive works team championship results

2022
The Dakar Rally - 2nd (Bahrain Raid Xtreme/Sebastien Loeb)

2021
Extreme E - 2nd (X44 Team/Sebastien Loeb/Cristina Gutierrez)
The Dakar Rally - 5th (Bahrain Raid Xtreme/Nani Roma)
World Endurance Championship GTE Am T - 8th (Aston Martin Racing #98)
World Endurance Championship GTE Am D - 8th (Dalla Lana/Farfus/Gomes)

2020
Le Mans 24 Hours GTE Pro - 1st  (Aston Martin Racing)
World Endurance Championship GT D - 1st (Thiim/Sorensen)
World Endurance Championship GT M - 1st (Aston Martin Racing)

2019
Le Mans 24 Hours GTE Pro - 12th  (Aston Martin Racing)
World Endurance Championship GT D - 9th (Thiim/Sorensen)
World Endurance Championship GT M - 4th (Aston Martin Racing)
World Endurance Championship GTE Am T - 7th (Aston Martin Racing #98)
World Endurance Championship GTE Am D - 8th (Dalla Lana/Lamy/Lauda)

2018
World Rallycross Championship T - 5th (GC Kompetition)
World Rallycross Championship D - 11th (Guerlain Chicherit GCK)
World Rallycross Championship D - 12th (Jerome Grosset-Janin GCK)
Chinese Rally Championship M - 2nd (FAW-VW Rally Team)
Chinese Rally Championship T - 2nd (FAW-VW Rally Team)
Chinese Rally Championship D - 3rd (Dean)

2017
Le Mans 24 Hours GTE Pro - 1st  (Aston Martin Racing)
World Endurance Championship GTE Am T - 1st (Aston Martin Racing #98)
World Endurance Championship GTE Am D - 1st (Dalla Lana/Lamy/Lauda)
World Endurance Championship GT D - 6th (Thiim/Sorensen)
World Endurance Championship GT M - 4th (Aston Martin Racing)
World Endurance Championship GTE Pro T - 5th (Aston Martin Racing #97)
Chinese Rally Championship M - 2nd (FAW-VW Rally Team)
Chinese Rally Championship D - 1st (Li)

2016
Chinese Rally Championship M – 1st (FAW-VW Rally Team)
Chinese Rally Championship D – 2nd (Dean)
World Endurance Championship GT M - 2nd (Aston Martin Racing)
World Endurance Championship GT D - 1st (Thiim/Sorensen)
World Endurance Championship GTE Pro T - 1st (Aston Martin Racing)
World Endurance Championship GTE Am T - 3rd (Aston Martin Racing)
World Endurance Championship GTE Am D - 3rd (Dalla Lana/Lamy/Lauda)
Le Mans 24 Hours GTE Pro – 5th (Aston Martin Racing)

2015
Chinese Rally Championship M – 1st (FAW-VW Rally Team)
Chinese Rally Championship D – 1st (Dean)
World Endurance Championship GT M – 3rd  (Aston Martin Racing)
World Endurance Championship GTE Pro T – 5th (Aston Martin Racing)
World Endurance Championship GTE Am T – 3rd (Aston Martin Racing)
World Endurance Championship GT D – 7th (McDowall/Rees)
World Endurance Championship GTE Am D – 3rd (Dalla Lana/Lamy/Lauda)
Le Mans 24 Hours GTE Pro – 4th (Aston Martin Racing)

2014
 World Endurance Championship GT M – 3rd (Aston Martin Racing) 
 World Endurance Championship GTE Pro T – 3rd (Aston Martin Racing)
 World Endurance Championship GTE Am T – 1st (Aston Martin Racing)
 World Endurance Championship GT D – 5th (Darren Turner/Stefan Mucke)
 World Endurance Championship GTE Am D – 1st (Heinemeier Hansson/Poulsen)
 Le Mans 24 Hours GTE Pro – 6th (Aston Martin Racing)
 Le Mans 24 Hours GTE Am – 1st (Aston Martin Racing)

2013
 World Endurance Championship GT M – 2nd (Aston Martin Racing) 
 World Endurance Championship GTE Pro T – 2nd (Aston Martin Racing)
 World Endurance Championship GTE Am T – 2nd (Aston Martin Racing)
 World Endurance Championship GT D – 3rd (Darren Turner/Stefan Mucke)
 World Endurance Championship GTE Am D – 1st (Stuart Hall/Jamie Campbell-Walter)
 Le Mans 24 Hours GTE Pro – 3rd (Aston Martin Racing)
 Le Mans 24 Hours GTE Am – 6th (Aston Martin Racing)

2012
 FIA World Rally Championship D – 11th (Dani Sordo)
 Le Mans 24 Hours GTE – 3rd (Aston Martin Racing)
 World Endurance Championship GTE Pro Trophy – 2nd (Aston Martin Racing)
 World Endurance Championship D – 33rd (Darren Turner/Stefan Mucke)
 Australian V8 Supercar Championship T – 2nd (Ford Performance Racing)
 Australian V8 Supercar Championship D – 3rd (Mark Winterbottom)

2011
 FIA World Rally Championship D – 8th (Dani Sordo)
 Australian V8 Supercar Championship T – 2nd (Ford Performance Racing)
 Australian V8 Supercar Championship D – 3rd (Mark Winterbottom)

2010
 Le Mans 24 Hours – 5th (Aston Martin Racing)
 Le Mans Series T – 6th (Aston Martin Racing)
 Le Mans Series D – 15th (Stefan Mucke/Adrian Fernandez/Harold Primat)
 Australian V8 Supercar Championship T – 4th (Ford Performance Racing)
 Australian V8 Supercar Championship D – 3rd (Mark Winterbottom)

2009
 Le Mans 24 Hours – 4th (Aston Martin Racing)
 Le Mans Series T – 1st (Aston Martin Racing)
 Le Mans Series D – 1st (Stefan Mucke/Jan Charouz/Tomas Enge)
 Australian V8 Supercar Championship T – 4th (Ford Performance Racing)
 Australian V8 Supercar Championship D – 5th (Mark Winterbottom)

2008
 FIA World Rally Championship M – 3rd (Subaru)
 FIA World Rally Championship D – 5th (Chris Atkinson)
 Le Mans 24 Hours GT1 – 1st (Aston Martin Racing)
 Le Mans Series T – 5th (Aston Martin Racing)
 Le Mans Series D – 9th (Stefan Mucke/Jan Charouz)
 Australian V8 Supercar Championship T – 2nd (Ford Performance Racing)
 Australian V8 Supercar Championship D – 2nd (Mark Winterbottom)

2007
 FIA World Rally Championship M – 3rd (Subaru)
 FIA World Rally Championship D – 5th (Petter Solberg)
 Le Mans 24 Hours GT1 – 1st (Aston Martin Racing)
 Australian V8 Supercar Championship T – 4th (Ford Performance Racing)
 Australian V8 Supercar Championship D – 5th (Mark Winterbottom)

2006
 FIA World Rally Championship M – 3rd (Subaru)
 FIA World Rally Championship D – 6th (Petter Solberg)
 Le Mans 24 Hours GT1 – 2nd (Aston Martin Racing)
 American Le Mans Series GT1  – 2nd (Aston Martin Racing)
 Australian V8 Supercar Championship T – 2nd (Ford Performance Racing)
 Australian V8 Supercar Championship D – 3rd (Mark Winterbottom)

2005
 FIA World Rally Championship M – 4th (Subaru)
 FIA World Rally Championship D – 2nd (Petter Solberg)
 Le Mans 24 Hours GT1– 3rd (Aston Martin Racing)
 American Le Mans Series GT1  – 5th (Aston Martin Racing)
 FIA GT – 5th (Aston Martin Racing)
 Australian V8 Supercar Championship T – 8th (Ford Performance Racing)
 Australian V8 Supercar Championship D – 9th (Jason Bright)

2004
 FIA World Rally Championship M – 3rd (Subaru)
 FIA World Rally Championship D – 2nd (Petter Solberg)
 Le Mans 24 Hours GT1 – 3rd (Prodrive Ferrari 550)
 Australian V8 Supercar Championship – 15th (Glenn Seton – Ford Performance Racing)

2003
 FIA World Rally Championship M – 3rd (Subaru)
 FIA World Rally Championship D – 1st (Petter Solberg)
 SCCA ProRally Championship T – 2nd (Subaru Rally Team USA)
 SCCA ProRally Championship D – 5th (Ramana Lagemann)
 Le Mans 24 Hours GTS – 1st (Prodrive Ferrari 550)
 American Le Mans Series GTS M – 2nd (Prodrive Ferrari 550)
 Australian V8 Supercar Championship – 5th (Craig Lowndes – Ford Performance Racing)

2002
 FIA World Rally Championship M – 3rd (Subaru)
 FIA World Rally Championship D – 2nd (Petter Solberg)
 SCCA ProRally Championship D – 3rd (Mark Lovell)
 SCCA ProRally Championship T – 2nd (Subaru Rally Team USA)
 FIA European Touring Car Championship M – 3rd (Volvo)
 FIA European Touring Car Championship D – 5th (Rickard Rydell)
 American Le Mans Series GTS T – 5th (Prodrive Ferrari 550)

2001
 FIA World Rally Championship M – 4th (Subaru)
 FIA World Rally Championship D – 1st (Richard Burns)
 SCCA ProRally Championship D – 1st (Mark Lovell)
 SCCA ProRally Championship T – 1st (Subaru Rally Team USA)
 FIA GT Championship T – 5th (Prodrive Ferrari 550)

2000
 FIA World Rally Championship M – 3rd (Subaru)
 FIA World Rally Championship D – 2nd (Richard Burns)
 British Touring Car Championship M – 1st (Ford)
 British Touring Car Championship D – 1st (Alain Menu

1999 
 FIA World Rally Championship M – 2nd (Subaru)
 FIA World Rally Championship D – 2nd (Richard Burns)
 British Touring Car Championship M – 6th (Ford)
 British Touring Car Championship D – 11th (Alain Menu)

1998 
 FIA World Rally Championship M – 3rd (Subaru)
 FIA World Rally Championship D – 3rd (Colin McRae)
 British Touring Car Championship M – 4th (Honda)
 British Touring Car Championship D – 3rd (James Thompson)

1997 
 FIA World Rally Championship M – 1st (Subaru)
 FIA World Rally Championship D – 2nd (Colin McRae)
 FIA Asia-Pacific Rally Championship M – 1st (Subaru)
 FIA Asia-Pacific Rally Championship D – 1st (Kenneth Erikkson)
 British Touring Car Championship M – 3rd (Honda)
 British Touring Car Championship D – 5th (James Thompson)

1996 
 FIA World Rally Championship M – 1st (Subaru)
 FIA World Rally Championship D – 2nd (Colin McRae)
 FIA Asia-Pacific Rally Championship M – 2nd (Subaru)
 FIA Asia-Pacific Rally Championship D – 1st (Kenneth Eriksson)

1995
 FIA World Rally Championship M – 1st (Subaru)
 FIA World Rally Championship D – 1st (Colin McRae)
 FIA Asia-Pacific Rally Championship – 2nd (Colin McRae)
 British Touring Car Championship M – 8th (Alfa Romeo)
 British Touring Car Championship D – 16th (Gabriele Tarquini)

1994 
 FIA World Rally Championship M – 2nd (Subaru)
 FIA World Rally Championship D – 2nd (Carlos Sainz)
 FIA Asia-Pacific Rally Championship – 1st (Possum Bourne)

1993 
 World Rally Championship M – 3rd (Subaru)
 World Rally Championship D – 5th (Colin McRae)
 FIA Asia-Pacific Rally Championship – 1st (Possum Bourne)
 British Rally Championship – 1st (Richard Burns)

1992 
 World Rally Championship M – 4th (Subaru)
 World Rally Championship D – 8th (Colin McRae)
 British Rally Championship – 1st (Colin McRae)
 British Touring Car Championship – 8th (Tim Sugden)

1991 
 World Rally Championship M – 6th (Subaru)
 World Rally Championship D – 8th (Markku Alen)
 British Rally Championship – 1st (Colin McRae)
 British Touring Car Championship – 4th (Steve Soper)

1990
 World Rally Championship M – 4th (Subaru)
 World Rally Championship D – 14th (Possum Bourne)
 French Rally Championship – 1st (Francois Chatriot)
 European Rally Championship – 5th (Francois Chatriot)
 British Touring Car Championship class B – 1st (2nd overall) (Frank Sytner)

1989 
 French Rally Championship – 1st (Francois Chatriot)
 Belgian Rally Championship – 1st (Marc Duez)
 European Rally Championship – 9th (Francois Chatriot)
 British Touring Car Championship class B – 1st (James Weaver) 2nd overall

1988 
 European Rally Championship – 2nd (Patrick Snijers)
 Belgian Rally Championship – 1st (Patrick Snijers)
 French Rally Championship – 2nd (Bernard Beguin)
 Italian Rally Championship – 2nd (Andrea Zanussi)
 British Touring Car Championship – 1st (Fank Sytner)

1987
 French Rally Championship – 2nd (Bernard Beguin)
 Middle East Rally Championship – 2nd (Saeed Al Hajri)
 British Touring Car Championship class B – 3rd (Frank Sytner)

1986
 Middle East Rally Championship – 4th (Saeed Al Hajri)
 British Rally Championship – 4th (Jimmy McRae)
 Irish Tarmac Championship – 2nd (Billy Coleman)

1985 
 Middle East Rally Championship – 1st (Saeed Al Hajri)
 European Rally Championship – 8th (Bernard Beguin)
 French Rally Championship – 7th (Bernard Beguin)
 Irish Tarmac Championship – 4th (Billy Coleman)

1984 
 Middle East Rally Championship – 1st (Saeed Al Hajri)
 European Rally Championship – 2nd (Henri Toivonen)

See also
 David Richards
 Prodrive F1
 Aston Martin Racing

References

Other sources
Cropley, S (9 November 2004). Beauty and the beast. Autocar pp. 44–51.
Cropley, S (30 November 2004). Out, but not down. Autocar pp. 72–73.

External links

Prodrive's website
Subaru World Rally Team Homepage
Aston Martin Racing Homepage
American Le Mans Series Homepage

Auto parts suppliers of the United Kingdom
Automotive motorsports and performance companies
Companies based in Banbury
Companies established in 1984
British auto racing teams
World Rally Championship teams
24 Hours of Le Mans teams
FIA GT Championship teams
British Touring Car Championship teams
Apax Partners companies
Car manufacturers of the United Kingdom
Car brands
Global RallyCross Championship teams
British racecar constructors
Intercontinental Rally Challenge teams
European Rally Championship teams
Dakar rally racing teams
British GT Championship teams
American Le Mans Series teams